The Woodburn Dragstrip is a quarter-mile NHRA dragstrip located in Woodburn, Oregon.

Woodburn Dragstrip opened in June 1961 as an ⅛-mile dragstrip operated by the Multnomah Hot Rod Council and the Northwest Timing Association.  In 1963, the track was lengthened to provide for 1/4-mile drag racing. Jim Livingston purchased the Woodburn Dragstrip in 1972.

Since 1972, the track has been named NHRA Track of the Year in the Northwest numerous times, including five-in-a-row since 1999.  In addition, the track was honored as Business of the Year by the Woodburn Area Chamber of Commerce in 1989, one of the first tracks in the country to receive such an honor.

Woodburn was the first drag strip on the West Coast to use electronic scoreboards. In 1999, Livingston added track bleachers that had previously been used in Seattle Kingdome.

In 2004, the track manager estimated that Woodburn Dragstrip hosts more than 200,000 fans and participants annually, contributing more than $20 million to the local economy.

Woodburn Dragstrip has hosted NHRA Regional series (now the Lucas Oil series) events since 1977.  It hosts racing events most weekends from March–October.The track is said to be on an old airstrip. Woodburn Dragstrip is co-owned by the Cherie and Joey Severance.

See also

 List of sports venues in Portland, Oregon

References

External links
 

1961 establishments in Oregon
Motorsport venues in Oregon
NHRA Division 6 drag racing venues
Sports venues in Oregon
Tourist attractions in Marion County, Oregon
Woodburn, Oregon